Elections to the Supreme Soviet of the Estonian SSR were held on 27 February 1955. The Bloc of Communists and Non-Party Candidates was the only party able to contest the elections, and won all 125 seats.

Results

See also
List of members of the Supreme Soviet of the Estonian Soviet Socialist Republic, 1955–1959

References

Estonia
Single-candidate elections
One-party elections
1955 in Estonia
Parliamentary elections in Estonia
Estonian Soviet Socialist Republic